Hit the Lights are an American pop punk band. 

Hit the Lights may also refer to:
 "Hit the Lights" (Metallica song), from Kill 'em All, 1983
 Hit the Lights (India Tour Edition), a 2011 compilation album by Jay Sean
 Hit the Lights (Japan Edition), a 2011 compilation album by Jay Sean
 "Hit the Lights" (Jay Sean song), 2011
 "Hit the Lights" (Selena Gomez & the Scene song), 2012